SRO may refer to:
 Saudi Railways Organization (SRO)
 School resource officer, a police officer assigned to a school
 Self-regulatory organization
 Senior reactor operator, a supervisory position overseeing the work of the nuclear reactor operators
 Senior responsible owner, a role in project management
 Side Roads Order, UK order relating to roads
 Single room occupancy, in housing
 Slovenský rozhlas ("SRo"), Slovak radio group
 S.R.O. (album), by Herb Alpert and the Tijuana Brass, 1966
 Suhestiyon, Reaksyon at Opinyon, a Philippine radio program
 SRO Cinemaserye, Philippine 2009 TV drama
 Standing-room only, an event in which all seats are occupied leaving only places to stand
 Stéphane Ratel Organisation, a motorsports organization
 Strontium oxide (SrO), an inorganic compound
 "S.R.O.", a song from the 1998 Avail album Over the James
 s.r.o (Společnost s ručením omezeným) after the names of Czech and Slovak businesses indicates limited liability
 Standard Roman Orthography, Cree language